Acalyptris gielisi is a moth of the family Nepticulidae. It was described by Van Nieukerken in 2010. It is known from the United Arab Emirates.

The wingspan is 4.2 mm for males and 4.5 mm for females. Adults have been recorded in April.

References

Nepticulidae
Endemic fauna of the United Arab Emirates
Moths of Asia
Moths described in 2010